Pterolophia sanghirica is a species of beetle in the family Cerambycidae. It was described by E. Forrest Gilmour in 1947.

References

sanghirica
Beetles described in 1947